Phaleria capitata grows as a shrub or small tree up to  tall, with a stem diameter of up to . Twigs are reddish brown. Inflorescences usually bear five flowers. Habitat is forest from sea-level to  altitude. P. capitata grows naturally in Sri Lanka, Peninsular Malaysia, Sumatra, Borneo, Sulawesi, Maluku, the Philippines, New Guinea, the Caroline Islands and Tonga.

It is a shade tolerant, tropical species. Common/English names include Ongael, Phaleria Jack.

References

capitata
Plants described in 1822
Flora of Sri Lanka
Flora of Malesia
Flora of New Guinea
Flora of the Caroline Islands
Flora of Tonga